Mario Blasich (18 July 1878 – 3 May 1945) was an Italian politician and physician, and an important member of the Autonomist Party of Fiume, during the short lived autonomy of the Free State of Fiume.

Life
Blasich graduated in medicine and participated in politics alongside Riccardo Zanella, leader of the Fiuman Autonomist Party or Independent Party (as it was known to everyone in the city of Rijeka). In 1914, upon the outbreak of the First World War, Blasich was inducted into the Austro-Hungarian army alongside Zanella, and was sent to the Eastern Front. There he surrendered to the enemy, claiming to be an Italian irredentist and asked to be sent to Italy to join the Italian army. His request was granted and upon arrival in Italy, he was enlisted with the rank of Captain Doctor, fighting for the duration of the war on the front line. The Hungarian government however for his initial surrenderment, condemned him to death for desertion.

At the end of the war in 1919, Blasich continued to work closely with Zanella and the independent party. Initially he approved the companionship of Gabriele d'Annunzio, however he later politically opposed the poet. After the Treaty of Rapallo on 12 November 1920, which established the Free State of Fiume in Rijeka, Blasich became the deputy to the Constituent Assembly and the Minister of the Interior of the Zanella Government, formed in October of that year.

On 3 March 1922 the Government of the Free State of Fiume was overthrown by a coup d'etat lasting 18 months by Italian fascists and ex-legionnaires with the active participation of 2000 armed Trieste Fascists (Trieste earlier being annexed by Italy in 1920) led by Francesco Giunta. Zanella and Blasich as a result were forced to flee to Yugoslavia. After the annexation of Fiume to Italy and the Treaty of Rome, 27 January 1924, almost all members of the Constituent Assembly in exile (except Zanella) returned to the city, and Blasich resumed his medical profession.

Blasich lost the use of his legs due to illness, following the armistice of 8 September 1943. He was contacted by other supporters of the movement, Joseph Sincich, Peteani Leone, and Vittorio Sablich, Yugoslavian communist partisans whose aim was liberation from nazi-fascists, however Blasich refused state publicly that he supported the annexation of the city to Yugoslavia, as was required by the emissaries of Josip Broz Tito.

Death
In the night between 2 and 3 May 1945, while the last German troops abandoned the city that was captured by Yugoslav partisans, Blasich was killed in his home by Communist partisans. On 3 May 1945 and in the days immediately following his death, other separatist leaders, such as Joseph Sincich and Nevio Skull, were also murdered in the Fiume Autonomists purge.

See also
Titoism
Free State of Fiume
Charter of Carnaro
Treaty of Rapallo (1920)
Francesco Giunta
Julian March

References

Autonomy flood (1896–1947) and the figure of Riccardo Zanella (Proceedings of the Conference held in Trieste November 3, 1996), Rome 1997.
Studies Society Fiume Rome - Hrvatski Institut za Zagreb Povijest, Victims of Italian nationals in and around River (1939–1947) / u Žrtve talijanske nacionalnosti Rijeci the okolici (1939.-1947.), Rome 2002, Ministry for Cultural Heritage and Cultural Activities - Directorate General of archives.
Stelli John (ed.), The memory lives. River and witness interviews, Rome 2008, Society for the Study Fiumani.
Antonella Ercolani, From Rijeka in Rijeka. Profile political history from 1918 to 1947, 2009 Soveria Mannelli, Rubbettino, esp. 312-316.

1878 births
1945 deaths
20th-century Italian politicians
20th-century Italian physicians
19th-century Italian people
Austro-Hungarian military personnel of World War I
Prisoners sentenced to death by Hungary
Italian prisoners sentenced to death
People killed by Yugoslav Partisans
Italian military personnel of World War I